Arbitrium is a viral peptide produced by bacteriophages to communicate with each other. It is six amino acids long, and is produced when a phage infects a bacterial host. It signals to other phages that a host has been infected.

Discovery
Arbitrium was first observed by a team led by Rotem Sorek, a microbial geneticist at the Weizmann Institute of Science in Israel. They were studying communication in Bacillus subtilis bacteria - in particular, how bacteria infected with phages warn nearby uninfected bacteria about the presence of these viruses. They found that the phages (strain phi3T) communicated with each other to co-ordinate their infection.

Mechanism
Many phages, known as temperate phages,  when they infect a bacterium,  may enter either the lytic or the lysogenic pathway. The lytic pathway causes the host to produce and release progeny virion, usually killing it in the process. The lysogenic pathway involves the virus inserting itself into the bacterium's chromosome. At a later stage, the viral genome is activated, and it continues along the lytic pathway of producing and releasing progeny virions.

Arbitrium is used by at least some phages to decide how common fresh hosts are. Each infection causes the production of some arbitrium, and the remaining phages gauge the concentration of arbitrium around them. If the arbitrium concentration is too high, it may indicate that uninfected hosts are running out. The viruses then switch from lysis to lysogeny, so as to not deplete all available hosts.

According to a team led by Alberto Marina at the Biomedical Institute of Valencia in Spain, also studying the Bacillus subtilis/ SPbeta phage system, arbitrium (AimP) binds to the AimX transcription factor AimR, and suppresses the activity of AimX, a negative regulator of lysogeny. Marina has also shown in the same  system that the virus's arbitrium receptor interacts not only with bacterial genes that help it reproduce, but also with several other stretches of DNA. He has suggested that arbitrium signals may be able to alter the activity of important bacterial genes.

More recently, another team at the Sorek lab, headed by Avigail Stokar-Avihail and Nitzan Tal, has shown similar systems in other species of Bacilllus bacteria, the pathogenic species Bacillus anthracis, Bacillus cereus, and Bacillus thuringiensis.    They speculate that "the occurrence of peptide-based communication systems among phages more broadly remains to be explored."

Applications
Sorek has suggested that since human viruses like HIV and herpes simplex can cause active and latent infections, they might be using an arbitrium-like system to communicate. In this case, that analogue could be used to suppress infections by making the viruses completely latent. Prof. Martha Clokie, of the University of Leicester, has hailed the discovery of viral communication as 'transformative'.

See also

 Quorum sensing - the corresponding phenomenon in bacteria

References

Phage proteins